The 1889 North Carolina Tar Heels football team represented the University of North Carolina in the 1889 college football season.  They scheduled two games with a final record of 1–1. The team captains for the 1889 season were Lacy Little and Steve Bragaw. After the University banned football there were no games in 1890. Football was reinstated in 1891 and a coach (William P. Graves) was hired. Although a game was scheduled in February, it was canceled and games would not resume until the next academic year.

Schedule

References

North Carolina
North Carolina Tar Heels football seasons
North Carolina Tar Heels football